Lewy may refer to:

 Lewy (surname)
 Levi, a biblical personage
 Lewy body, abnormal aggregates of protein that develop inside nerve cells of the brain
 Dementia with Lewy bodies, progressive brain disease associated with degenerative dementia in the elderly
 A nickname for Polish footballer Robert Lewandowski (born 1988)

See also